All the Nations Airports is the third studio album recorded by the indie rock band Archers of Loaf.  Although the band was still signed to Alias Records the album was released by Elektra Records in 1996, making it the first to be distributed by a major label.

Track listing
All songs written by Eric Bachmann, Eric Johnson, Matt Gentling and Mark Price.
"Strangled by the Stereo Wire"
"All the Nations Airports"
"Scenic Pastures"
"Worst Defense"
"Attack of the Killer Bees"
"Rental Sting"
"Assassination on X-Mas Eve"
"Chumming the Ocean"
"Vocal Shrapnel"
"Bones of Her Hands"
"Bumpo"
"Form and File"
"Acromegaly"
"Distance Comes in Droves"
"Bombs Away"

Personnel
Eric Bachmann - vocals, guitar
Matt Gentling - bass
Eric Johnson - guitar
Mark Price - drums

References

External links
 All The Nations Airports at Discogs

1996 albums
Archers of Loaf albums
Elektra Records albums
Alias Records albums
Merge Records albums
Fire Records (UK) albums